Tachygonus is a genus of flea weevils in the beetle family Curculionidae. There are more than 80 described species in Tachygonus.

Species
These 88 species belong to the genus Tachygonus:

 Tachygonus alineae Monte, 1942
 Tachygonus almeidai Monte, 1946
 Tachygonus araujoi Monte, 1942
 Tachygonus argentinus Viana, 1949
 Tachygonus atrosignatus Monte, 1949
 Tachygonus autuoni Monte, 1942
 Tachygonus bauhiniae Hustache, 1941
 Tachygonus bicolor Monte, 1949
 Tachygonus bicoloripes Viana, 1949
 Tachygonus bidentatus Champion & G.C., 1907
 Tachygonus bifasciculatus Champion & G.C., 1907
 Tachygonus bitancourti Monte, 1942
 Tachygonus bondari Marshall, 1938
 Tachygonus buchanani Monte, 1949
 Tachygonus caseyi Champion & G.C., 1907
 Tachygonus centralis LeConte, 1868
 Tachygonus comptus Monte, 1949
 Tachygonus costalimai Monte, 1942
 Tachygonus curvicrus Champion & G.C., 1906
 Tachygonus decarloi Viana, 1954
 Tachygonus dufaui Hustache, 1932
 Tachygonus erythroxyli Hespenheide, 2012
 Tachygonus farruginous Monte
 Tachygonus fasciculosus Boheman, 1839
 Tachygonus femoralis Monte, 1949
 Tachygonus ferrugineus Monte, 1949
 Tachygonus fiebrigi Voss, 1943
 Tachygonus fiohri Champion & G.C., 1906
 Tachygonus flavisetis Champion & G.C., 1906
 Tachygonus fulvipes LeConte, 1876
 Tachygonus garciai Viana, 1954
 Tachygonus godweyi Marshall & G.A.K., 1926
 Tachygonus gowdeyi Marshall, 1926
 Tachygonus gracilipes Casey & T.L., 1897
 Tachygonus guerini Monte, 1942
 Tachygonus horridus Laporte, 1840
 Tachygonus hydropicus Gyllenhal, 1839
 Tachygonus impar Voss, 1954
 Tachygonus inconstans Hustache, 1939
 Tachygonus ingae Monte, 1944
 Tachygonus kuscheli Viana, 1954
 Tachygonus laminicrus Marshall, 1938
 Tachygonus laminipes Marshall & G.A.K., 1938
 Tachygonus laticrus Champion & G.C., 1906
 Tachygonus lecontei Gyllenhal, 1833
 Tachygonus leprieuri Chevrolat & L.A.A., 1829-44
 Tachygonus leprieurii Chevrolat in Guérin-Méneville, 1844
 Tachygonus martinezi Viana, 1954
 Tachygonus minans Kogan, 1963
 Tachygonus minutus Blatchley, 1920
 Tachygonus mirus Monte, 1949
 Tachygonus monrosi Viana, 1954
 Tachygonus montanus Monte, 1949
 Tachygonus neivai Monte, 1942
 Tachygonus nigar Monte
 Tachygonus niger Monte, 1949
 Tachygonus nigrescens Blatchley, 1922
 Tachygonus nigrocristatus Champion & G.C., 1906
 Tachygonus nitidus Monte, 1949
 Tachygonus oglobini Viana, 1949
 Tachygonus ogloblini Viana, 1949
 Tachygonus oliverioi Monte, 1942
 Tachygonus orfilai Viana, 1954
 Tachygonus paraguayensis Viana, 1954
 Tachygonus pectinisquamis Champion & G.C., 1906
 Tachygonus phalangium Klima & A., 1936
 Tachygonus pubescens Monte, 1944
 Tachygonus pullus Hustache, 1941
 Tachygonus quadrisignatus Champion, 1910
 Tachygonus quinquedentatus Champion & G.C., 1906
 Tachygonus regularis Hustache, 1939
 Tachygonus rhombus Casey, 1897
 Tachygonus riggii Viana, 1949
 Tachygonus rufipennis Voss, 1940
 Tachygonus rufovarius Kirsch & T., 1875
 Tachygonus rufus Hustache, 1939
 Tachygonus rugosipennis Hustache, 1941
 Tachygonus rugosus Monte, 1949
 Tachygonus schonherri Faust & J., 1896
 Tachygonus schönherri Faust, J., 1896
 Tachygonus sculpturatus Monte, 1944
 Tachygonus scutellaris Kirsch & T., 1875
 Tachygonus semirufus Champion & G.C., 1906
 Tachygonus sinuaticrus Champion & G.C., 1906
 Tachygonus spinipes Casey & T.L., 1897
 Tachygonus tardipes LeConte, 1876
 Tachygonus validus Monte, 1949
 Tachygonus willineri Viana

References

Further reading

 
 
 

Curculioninae
Articles created by Qbugbot